Moyglare Airfield is a private airfield located  northwest of Maynooth, a town in County Kildare, Ireland.

Facilities 
Mogas is available on site.

References

Airports in the Republic of Ireland
Transport in County Meath